Avowed is an upcoming role-playing video game developed by Obsidian Entertainment and published by Xbox Game Studios for Windows and Xbox Series X/S. Avowed will take place in the same universe as Pillars of Eternity in the world of Eora.

Development 
Obsidian Entertainment announced a new first-person AAA RPG title called Avowed during its Xbox Games showcase in July 2020. Avowed is a first-person role-playing game takes place in the world of Eora, the same setting as the Pillars of Eternity series. Avowed is the first AAA RPG project by Obsidian Entertainment since Microsoft bought the studio in 2018. Although Avowed will take place in the same universe as Pillars of Eternity, the gameplay will not be the same, and there will be no contact with the Pillars of Eternity series in terms of story. Avowed will be a first-person RPG, not an isometric RPG like the rest of the Pillars of Eternity series.

References 

Upcoming video games
Action role-playing video games
Obsidian Entertainment games
Windows games
Xbox Series X and Series S games